The 2012 Southeastern Louisiana Lions football team represented Southeastern Louisiana University in the 2012 NCAA Division I FCS football season. The Lions were led by new head coach Ron Roberts  and played their home games at Strawberry Stadium. They are a member of the Southland Conference. They finished the season 5–6, 5–2 in Southland play to finish in third place.

Media
All Lions games can be heard on KSLU 90.9 FM and online at LionSports.net.

Roster

Schedule

Game summaries

Missouri
 
The Lions open the season for Ron Roberts on the road against the Missouri Tigers. It will be the first ever meeting between the two schools.

Sources:

South Dakota State

The Lions first home game comes against South Dakota State. This is the first of a home-and-home series and is the first ever meeting between the two schools. The Lions will head to South Dakota in 2013 to continue this series.

Sources:

UT Martin

The Skyhawks and the Lions clash for the 6th time in school history with this 2012 contest. Currently the Lions lead the series 4–1.

Sources:

McNeese State

The Lions try to end a long losing streak against McNeese in 2012. The series looks fairly lose with McNeese holding a 22–15 record against the Lions, but recent history has the Cowboys dominating the Lions as they have won 6 straight.

Sources:

Lamar

Lamar may be a fairly new rival for the Lions, but they have a 3–1 record overall against Southeastern Louisiana. The last win for Southeastern Louisiana over Lamar was back in 1969.

Sources:

UAB

Non-conference play concludes to begin October as the Lions and Blazers face each other for the first time.

Sources:

Northwestern State

The Lions and Demons have had a long and close series overall with this being the 44th meeting. The Demons own a slim 22–21 advantage in the overall series.

Sources:

Central Arkansas

The sixth contest between the Lions and Bears finds the Lions wanting to turn this series around. The Bears own a 4–1 advantage and have won two straight.

Sources:

Sam Houston State

As conference play begins to wind down, the Lions and Bearkats meet for the 13th time with the Bearkats owning an 8–4 advantage.

Sources:

Stephen F. Austin

The final home game features the 15th meeting between the Lumberjacks and Lions. The Lumberjacks own a slim 8–5–1 advantage in the overall series.

Sources:

Nicholls State

The River Bell Classic ends the regular season for the Lions as they meet their main rival- the Colonels. It's the 22nd meeting with the Colonels owning a 12–9 advantage in the series. The Lions will attempt to push their win streak over the Colonels to two straight.

Sources:

References

Southeastern Louisiana
Southeastern Louisiana Lions football seasons
Southeastern Louisiana Lions football